Bohemia  is a region consisting of the western two-thirds of the contemporary Czech Republic.

Bohemia may also refer to:

Historical countries 
 Kingdom of Bohemia, a medieval and early modern monarchy in Central Europe
 Lands of the Bohemian Crown, a monarchy comprising all historical Czech lands
 Duchy of Bohemia, a predecessor of Kingdom of Bohemia

Places

England 
 
 Bohemia, Hastings, a suburb and electoral ward of Hastings, East Sussex
 Bohemia, Wiltshire

United States
 Bohemia, Louisiana, a historical town in Plaquemines Parish
 Bohemia, New York, a hamlet in Suffolk County
 Bohemia Mountain, a mountain in Oregon
 Bohemia River, a tributary of the Elk River in Maryland and Delaware
 Bohemia Township (disambiguation), a list of places
 Mount Bohemia, a mountain in Michigan

Music
 Bohemia (rapper) (born 1979), Pakistani-American Punjabi rapper
 Bohemia (Ils album), an album released by Ils in 2005 on Distinct'ive Records
 Bohemia (Leo Sidran album), 2004
 "Bohemia", a 1919 ragtime composition by Joseph Lamb
 Bohemia Suburbana, a Guatemalan rock band

Beer
 A beer by the Cuauhtémoc Moctezuma Brewery, a subsidiary of Heineken International
 A Brazilian brewery founded in 1853 and currently owned by Anheuser-Busch InBev
 National Bohemian, a brand of beer originally brewed in Baltimore, Maryland, now owned by the Pabst Brewing Company
 Bohemian style beer, created in 1842 in Pilsner, Bohemia

Other
 Bohemia (newspaper), the title of newspapers in Prague
 SS Bohemia, a Hamburg Amerika Linie steamship
 Bohemianism, a cultural movement of wanderers, adventurers, or vagabonds
 Bohemia Interactive Studio, a software company
 Acacia cuspidifolia, a tree called "bohemia"

See also
 
 Bohemian (disambiguation)